Gallard is a surname. Notable people with the surname include: 

Esteban Gallard (1901–1929), Cuban boxer
Jill Gallard (born 1968), British diplomat
Michel de Gallard (1921–2007), French painter

See also
Galland
Hallard
Mallard (surname)